Queen of the Night is a 2001 Croatian film directed by Branko Schmidt. It was Croatia's submission to the 74th Academy Awards for the Academy Award for Best Foreign Language Film, but was not accepted as a nominee.

See also

Cinema of Croatia
List of submissions to the 74th Academy Awards for Best Foreign Language Film

References

External links

Queen of the Night at Filmski-Programi.hr 

2001 films
2001 comedy-drama films
2000s Croatian-language films
Films directed by Branko Schmidt
Croatian comedy-drama films
Films set in 1968